Pandy is a hamlet in Monmouthshire, south east Wales, United Kingdom.

Location 
The Wales–England border is one mile to the north, and the Offa's Dyke Path and Marches Way pass through the village.

History 
The village of Pandy ranges from the Pandy watermill at Allt-yr-Ynys in the north to the edge of Lanfihangel Crucorney to the south. The fulling-mill at Pandy served the Llanover estate in the 17th century producing wool, which was turned into Welsh flannel. Pandy is the Welsh word for a fulling-mill.

The village was on a route used by the early railways; the Abergavenny to Hereford line still passes to the west. There was at one time the Grosmont tramroad as well, now demolished. Raymond Williams was born in a cottage next to Offa's Dyke where his father was a railway signalman on the Hereford to Abergavenny railway line.

The village was redeveloped in the Victorian era by a pioneering lady architect, Bernadette Rocher, who, in the 1870s, extended and reworked many of the older properties in local red sandstone. She is buried at the parish church at Oldcastle, Monmouthshire, a short distance to the northwest.

Amenities

The village has no parish church, but has two Nonconformist chapels, one Baptist and one Presbyterian Church of Wales.

The village has several campsites and small caravan parks and two pubs. The housing is a mix of Victorian era cottages, farms and villas and some 1970s housing estates such as Wern Gifford.

The Black Mountains rise up to the west of the village, with the outlying Skirrid looming high over the village to the east.

Pandy has two hotels, the Park Hotel and Allt Yr Ynys Country Hotel.

Transport
Pandy railway station closed in 1958, with trains running through between Hereford and Abergavenny on the Welsh Marches Line.

Notable people
The singer-songwriter MARINA  lived in Pandy for most of her childhood, although she was born in Brynmawr.
The socialist writer and academic Raymond Williams was also born in Pandy in 1921.

References

External links 
Kelly's Directory of 1901
www.geograph.co.uk : photos of Pandy and surrounding area

Villages in Monmouthshire